NCCI may refer to:

 National Council on Compensation Insurance
 National Correct Coding Initiative
 National Council of Churches in India
 Non-Contradictory Complementary Information, guidance for structural design to complement the Eurocodes